Coaley Wood Quarries is a  geological Site of Special Scientific Interest in Gloucestershire, notified in 1974.

The quarries lie within the Cotswold Area of Outstanding Natural Beauty. The site is listed in the ‘Stroud District’ Local Plan, adopted November 2005, Appendix 6 (online for download) as an SSSI and as a Regionally Important Geological Site (RIGS).

Geology
The site is abundant with fossils of Lower Jurassic age in the stratum called the Cephalopod bed. There are particularly good examples of ammonites which allow greater accuracy in dating the rocks. The ammonites present indicate that the strata are of early striatulum Subzone age. The sunken lane cuttings provide exposures of the underlying Cotswold Sand Formation and a thin, isolated sandstone layer contains rare ammonites called Haugia.

References

SSSI Source
 Natural England SSSI information on the citation
 Natural England SSSI information on the Coaley Wood Quarries unit

External links
 Natural England (SSSI information)

Sites of Special Scientific Interest in Gloucestershire
Sites of Special Scientific Interest notified in 1974
Quarries in Gloucestershire
Cotswolds